HMS Turbulent (N98) was a T-class submarine of the Royal Navy. She was laid down by Vickers Armstrong, Barrow and launched in May 1941.

Career
Turbulent spent most of her career serving in the Mediterranean. In that time she sank the following ships:

 Six Greek sailing vessels: the Prodromos, Aghios Apostolos, Aghios Yonizov, Evangelista, Aghios Dyonysios and Aghia Traio.
 Nine Italian merchants: Rosa M., Delia, Bolsena, Capo Arma, Regulus, Marte, Vittoria Beraldo, Pozzuoli and San Vincenzo
 The Italian sailing vessels Franco, San Giusto, Gesù Giuseppe e Maria and Pier Delle Vigne
 The Italian  
 The German ship Kreta
 The German auxiliary submarine tender Bengasi
 The Italian tanker 

Turbulent also damaged the Italian tanker Pozarica and the Italian cargo ship . Nino Bixio was carrying more than 3,000 Allied prisoners of war, of whom 336 were killed by either the explosion or drowning.

She also launched unsuccessful attacks on the following ships:

 An unidentified submarine off Fiume
 The Italian merchantmen Anna Maria Gualdi and Sestriere
 The , in two attacks
 The German transport Ankara 
 The Italian armed merchant cruiser Ramb III which was damaged by Turbulent while in Benghazi harbour
 The small Italian passenger / cargo vessel Principessa Mafalda

Sinking
On 23 February 1943 Turbulent sailed from Algiers for a patrol in the Tyrrhenian Sea. On 1 March is assumed that she torpedoed and sank the steamer San Vincenzo. On 3 March she shelled and sank the Italian motorsailers Gesù Giuseppe e Maria and Pier Delle Vigne. On 12 March the anti-submarine trawler Teti II sighted the periscope and conning tower of a submarine and attacked. Although the success of the attack is not sure, as a matter of fact Turbulent did not respond to any further messages and did not return when expected on 23 March. So, it was thought for a long time that either Turbulent fell victim of the Teti II attack or of a mine off Maddalena, Sardinia.

Aftermath
Turbulent sank a huge amount of enemy shipping and endured numerous attacks. The Royal history saying "Turbulent sank over 90,000 tons of enemy shipping. She was depth charged on over 250 occasions by enemy forces hunting her.

In recognition of this achievement, and the gallantry of Turbulent's crew, her commander, John Wallace Linton,   was posthumously awarded the Victoria Cross in May 1943.

Notes

References

 
 
 

 

1941 ships
Ships built in Barrow-in-Furness
British T-class submarines of the Royal Navy
Lost submarines of the United Kingdom
Maritime incidents in March 1943
World War II submarines of the United Kingdom
World War II shipwrecks in the Mediterranean Sea
Submarines sunk by Italian warships